Ammanath Babu Chandran (born 11 August 1963), better known by his stage name Edavela Babu, is an Indian actor who appears in the Malayalam cinema. He made his acting debut in 1982 with Idavela, from which he got his stage name. Since then, he has worked in over 200 films. Babu is the General Secretary of Association of Malayalam Movie Artists (AMMA). Currently, he is a part of the Indian National Congress political party.

Early life
He was born on 11 August 1963 to Raman and Shantha in Irinjalakuda, Kerala, India.

Filmography

Films

Television
Kerala Samajam : Oru Pravasi Kadha (Asianet)
Ayyappa Saranam (Amrita TV)
Panchavadippalam (flowers TV)
Kayamkulam Kochunnide Makan (Surya TV)
Mizhi Randilum (Surya TV)
Bharya (Asianet)
Kunjali Marakkar  (Asianet)
Sthree - Part 2 (Asianet)
Swami Ayyappan (Asianet)
Kayamkulam Kochunni (Surya TV)
Swantham Malootty (Surya TV)
Sayanna Swapangal (DD)
Chillu (Tele Cinema) (DD)
Sthree (Asianet)
Unnimoolam
Brammannyam
Neeharam
Innocent Stories
Gokulam
Charulatha
Ishtamayi
Pravesam
Mizhiyoram
Sparsam
Periyattin Theerathu
Ela Pozhiyum Kalam
Muttathu Varkey Stories
Desadanakilikal
Ashtambandham
O.Hendy Stories
Kaliyalla Kallyanam
Tele Cinema
Sayanna Swapangal
Andherdhar

References

External links
 
 
 Idavela Babu at MSI

Male actors from Kerala
Living people
1963 births
People from Irinjalakuda
Indian male film actors
Male actors in Malayalam cinema
20th-century Indian male actors
People from Thrissur
21st-century Indian male actors
Indian male television actors
Male actors in Malayalam television
Male actors from Thrissur